Thomas Clancy or Tom Clancy may refer to:

Thomas K. Clancy, professor of law at the University of Mississippi School of Law
Thomas Owen Clancy, American academic and historian
Tom Clancy (Australian footballer) (1887–1957), Australian rules footballer
Tom Clancy (Canadian football) (1872–1938), Canadian football coach and player
Tom Clancy (singer) (1924–1990), member of the Irish folk singing group The Clancy Brothers
Tom Clancy (1947–2013), American author
Tom Clancy (Gaelic footballer) (born 1992), Irish Gaelic footballer